Drop C tuning is an alternative guitar tuning where at least one string has been lowered to a C, but most commonly refers to CGCFAD, which can be described as D tuning with a 6th string dropped to C, or drop D tuning transposed down a whole step. Because of its heavier tone, it is most commonly used in rock and heavy metal music.

Variations 
 CGDGBE – Dropping the low E string to a C, and the A string to a G, to make a fifth chord. The rest of the strings remain the same.
 CADGBE – This is achieved by taking standard tuning (EADGBE), and dropping the low E to a C. All other strings remain in standard tuning.

Artists that have used CGCFAD
Alter Bridge (on some songs such as "Isolation")
Arch/Matheos
Black Stone Cherry
Chimaira (on most songs after their first album)
Dååth
Dope
Escape the Fate 
Heaven & Hell (on "Follow the Tears") 
King's X  (most later material and live performances, also used on some songs since Dogman)
Nickelback (on some songs) 
Nirvana (used on Blew)
Static-X
System Of A Down
Theory of a Deadman
Triggerfinger
Wintersun (on some songs)

Artists that have used CADGBE
 Bob Dylan – predominantly in the period 1965-1966.
 John Mayer – on the song "Neon".
 Muse – on the songs "Map Of The Problematique" & "Dead Inside"
 Brad Richter – on the piece "Flirtation"
 The Tallest Man on Earth – on the song "The Sparrow and the Medicine".

Artists that have used CGDGBE
Keola Beamer
Richard Thompson
Soundgarden

References

Guitar tunings

da:Guitarstemning#Drop C